The Great Plains is a large, flat region of land in North America.

Great Plains may also refer to:

 Great Plains (band), an American country music group
 Great Plains (Ohio band), a 1980s folk pop band
 "The Great Plains", a song by Scale the Summit from the album Carving Desert Canyons
 Great Plains Airlines, a defunct airline
 Great Hungarian Plain, a large plain spanning several countries in Eastern Europe
 Great Plains Software, a software company from Fargo, North Dakota that was acquired by Microsoft
 Microsoft Great Plains, accounting software now incorporated into Microsoft Dynamics GP
 Great Plains clothing brand, part of French Connection group
 Great Plains Aircraft Supply Company, an American company

See also
Great Planes (disambiguation)